Qamsar (also Romanized as Qamşar; also known as Shahrak-e Qamşar) is a village in Kahrizak Rural District, Kahrizak District, Ray County, Tehran Province, Iran. At the 2006 census, its population was 4,732, in 1,140 families.

References 

Populated places in Ray County, Iran